Luther may refer to:

People  
 Martin Luther (1483–1546), German monk credited with initiating the Protestant Reformation
 Luther (given name)
 Luther (surname)

Places 
 Luther (crater), a lunar crater named after astronomer Robert Luther
 Luther, Indiana, an unincorporated community in the United States
 Luther, Iowa, a town in Boone County, Iowa, United States
 Luther, Michigan, a village in Lake County, United States
 Luther, Montana, an unincorporated community in Carbon County, United States
 Luther, Oklahoma, a town in Oklahoma County, Oklahoma, United States

Arts, entertainment, and media

Fictional characters
 Luther, a character from The Adventures of Luther Arkwright limited comic book series
 Luther, a gang member in The Warriors (1979) American cult film
 Luther Bentley, the villain of Adventures of Captain Marvel (1941)
 Luther Stickell, a supporting character in the Mission: Impossible film franchise
 Detective Chief Inspector John Luther, the protagonist of the television series Luther

Films
 Luther (1928 film), a silent film starring Eugen Klöpfer
 Luther (1964 film), a TV play
 Luther (1974 film), a film starring Stacy Keach
 Luther (2003 film), a film starring Joseph Fiennes
 Luther: The Fallen Sun, a 2023 film based on the BBC TV series

Music
 Luther (album), a 1976 album by American recording artist group Luther
 Luther, a former band of Luther Vandross'

Other uses in arts, entertainment, and media
 Luther (comic strip), an American syndicated newspaper comic strip
 Luther (play), a 1961 play by John Osborne
 Luther (TV series), a British BBC crime drama featuring Idris Elba
 Dr. Luther, Canadian professional wrestler

Food
 Luther Burger, a hamburger or cheeseburger with a doughnut in place of a bun

See also 
 1303 Luthera, an asteroid named after astronomer Robert Luther
 Lothar, a Germanic given name
 Luther College (disambiguation), various educational institutions
 Lutheranism, the branch of Protestant Christianity begun by Martin Luther
 Luthier, a maker of stringed instruments
 Luthor (disambiguation)